Rossa is a comune (municipality) in the Province of Vercelli in the Italian region Piedmont, located about  northeast of Turin and about  northwest of Vercelli.

Rossa borders the following municipalities: Alto Sermenza, Balmuccia, Boccioleto, Cervatto, Cravagliana and Fobello.

References

Cities and towns in Piedmont